Bule Naipi (1922 – 17 July 1944) was a World War II Hero of Albania.

Bule Naipi was born in 1922 in Gjirokastër, Albania. As a member of the Communist Youth, she joined the Antifascist War. Since the beginnings of her childhood she faced grave difficulties as her father had left the city and emigrated to the US and had left Bule and her brother Sado alone. Both of them joined the Resistance against Nazi Germany.

Bule, after having shown extraordinary bravery in the war, ended up a prisoner of war in German hands. She died at only 22, killed by torture, and after Persefoni Kokëdhima was hanged on July 12, 1944, in the Çerçiz Topulli Square in Gjirokastër. She did not give up even in the most difficult last moments when she was lashed and tortured, and, as Kokedhima, never revealed any names of communist colleagues.

Bule Naipi and Persefoni Kokëdhima are commemorated by a statue which stands in Çerçiz Topulli plaza in Gjirokastër.

An Albanian movie, Ngadhnjim mbi vdekjen ("Triumph over death") recalls her life and that of Kokedhima. The movie had a huge success in China, where it was viewed by more than 100 million people.

References

Sources
Lame Çekani Bule, Persefoni "8 Nëntori", 1977, (Albanian)

1922 births
1944 deaths
People from Gjirokastër
Heroes of Albania
Albanian communists
Albanian resistance members
Female resistance members of World War II
Resistance members killed by Nazi Germany
People executed by Nazi Germany by hanging
Albanian people executed by Nazi Germany